William Lawrence Upham (April 4, 1888 in Akron, Ohio – September 14, 1959 in Newark, New Jersey) was a pitcher in Major League Baseball in 1915 and 1918.

External links

1888 births
1959 deaths
Major League Baseball pitchers
Brooklyn Tip-Tops players
Boston Braves players
Baseball players from Akron, Ohio
Akron Champs players
Bridgeport Orators players
Brockton Shoemakers players
Binghamton Bingoes players
Rochester Hustlers players
St. Paul Saints (AA) players